Per Lodenius (born February 28, 1966 in Norrtälje) is a Swedish politician who was an MP for the Centre Party from 2006 to 2021. He is an educated Swedish teacher, and in the early 1990s, he was self-employed as a freelance dance educator. He was elected to the Center Party in Stockholm County constituency in the 2006 election. He was a substitute member of the education committee from 2006-2021 and spokesman on special education issues. From 2011-2021, Lodenius was an ordinary member of Parliament's Cultural Affairs Committee and the Center Party's spokesperson on cultural issues.

Between 2011 and 2015, Lodenius was the district chairman of the Center Party in Stockholm County. Since 2017, he has been chairman of the Bygdegårdarnas national association.

Lodenius was a member of the Riksdag's sobriety group and Riksdag's disability forum, as well as the Swedish-British Parliamentary Association. Lodenius has also been a member of the municipal council in Norrtälje municipality since the 1994 local elections.

References

External links 

 Biography on the Riksdag website
 Said and done by Per Lodenius in Parliament

Living people
1966 births
Members of the Riksdag from the Centre Party (Sweden)
Members of the Riksdag 2006–2010
Members of the Riksdag 2010–2014
Members of the Riksdag 2014–2018
Members of the Riksdag 2018–2022